Zygomaturus is an extinct genus of giant marsupial belonging to the family Diprotodontidae which inhabited Australia from the Late Miocene to Late Pleistocene.

Description

 
It was a large animal, weighing 500 kg (1100 lbs) or over 700 kg (1544 lbs) and standing about 1.5 m (4.9 ft) tall and 2.5 m (8.2 ft) long.

Palaeobiology
In an analysis of remains from Cuddie Springs, the carbon isotope ratios suggests that it consumed both C3 and C4 plants, with a dental microwear texture indicative of browsing. Preserved remains suggest that Zygomaturus was widely distributed over Australia during the Pleistocene.

Evolution and extinction 
The earliest members of the genus such as Zygomaturus gilli appeared during the Late Miocene, during the regional Waitean faunal stage. It is thought that the youngest species, Zygomaturus trilobus became extinct during the latter half of the Late Pleistocene, with typical estimates being about 45,000 years ago, around the time of Aboriginal arrival in Australia. A surprisingly late date between 33.3 ±3.7 Kya and 36.7 ±5.1 Kya was reported  in 2017 from the Willandra Lakes Region in New South Wales, which if correct would represent the latest known date for any Australian Megafauna.

Related genera

References

Further reading
 Wildlife of Gondwana: Dinosaurs and Other Vertebrates from the Ancient Supercontinent (Life of the Past) by Pat Vickers Rich, Thomas Hewitt Rich, Francesco Coffa, and Steven Morton
Marsupial Nutrition by Ian D. Hume

Life of Marsupials by Hugh Tyndale-Biscoe
 Magnificent Mihirungs: The Colossal Flightless Birds of the Australian Dreamtime (Life of the Past) by Peter F. Murray, Patricia Vickers-Rich, and Pat Vickers Rich
 Classification of Mammals by Malcolm C. McKenna and Susan K. Bell
 Australia's Lost World: Prehistoric Animals of Riversleigh by Michael Archer, Suzanne J. Hand, and Henk Godthelp
 World Encyclopedia of Dinosaurs & Prehistoric Creatures: The Ultimate Visual Reference To 1000 Dinosaurs And Prehistoric Creatures Of Land, Air And Sea ... And Cretaceous Eras (World Encyclopedia) by Dougal Dixon
 The Illustrated Encyclopedia Of Prehistoric Life by Dougal Dixon

External links
 The Diprotodontids
3D rotatable model of the skull of Zygomaturus trilobus

Prehistoric vombatiforms
Pleistocene marsupials
Pleistocene genus extinctions
Pleistocene mammals of Australia
Fossil taxa described in 1857
Prehistoric marsupial genera